James Roland Kitts (June 14, 1900 – December 13, 1952) was an American football, basketball, and baseball player and coach. He served as head football coach at the University of Dallas from 1924 to 1925, Rice Institute—now known as Rice University–from 1934 to 1939, and at Virginia Polytechnic Institute (VPI)—now known as Virginia Tech—in 1941 and from 1946 to 1947. Kitts was also the head basketball coach at Rice from 1932 to 1938, tallying a mark of 58–56, and the head baseball coach at Dallas from 1924 to 1926 amassing a record of 26–15. Kitts was inducted into the Texas Sports Hall of Fame in 1956.

Coaching career
Kitts was hired as the head football coach at the University of Dallas in December 1923.

From 1934 to 1939, Kitts coached at Rice, and compiled a 33–29–4 record. His 1934 team went 9–1–1, however his 1939 team went 1–9–1.

Death
Kitts died on December 13, 1952 in El Paso, Texas.

Head coaching record

College football

See also
 List of college football head coaches with non-consecutive tenure

References

External links
 

1900 births
1952 deaths
American men's basketball players
Basketball coaches from Texas
Basketball players from Dallas
Dallas Crusaders baseball coaches
Dallas Crusaders men's basketball coaches
Dallas Hilltoppers football coaches
Rice Owls men's basketball coaches
Rice Owls football coaches
SMU Mustangs football players
SMU Mustangs men's basketball players
Virginia Tech Hokies football coaches
High school basketball coaches in the United States
High school football coaches in Texas
Sportspeople from Dallas
Coaches of American football from Texas
Players of American football from Dallas